Afshin Kazemi Ghezeljeh (born 23 November 1986) is an Iranian professional futsal player.

Honours

Country 
 FIFA Futsal World Cup
 Third place (1): 2016

Club 
 AFC Futsal Club Championship
 Champions (2): 2006 (Shensa) – 2012 (Giti Pasand)
 Runner-Up (1): 2013 (Giti Pasand)
 Iranian Futsal Super League
 Champion (5): 2003–04 (Shensa) – 2005–06 (Shensa) –  2007–08 (Tam Iran Khodro) – 2012–13 (Giti Pasand) – 2016–17 (Giti Pasand)
 Runner-Up (4): 2010–11 (Giti Pasand) – 2011–12 (Giti Pasand) – 2013–14 (Giti Pasand) – 2014–15 (Giti Pasand)

International goals

References

1986 births
Living people
People from Karaj
Futsal forwards
Iranian men's futsal players
Shensa Saveh FSC players
Tam Iran Khodro FSC players
Giti Pasand FSC players
Shahid Mansouri FSC players
Shahrvand Sari FSC players
21st-century Iranian people